Dancing Galaxy is the third studio album by the Israel goa trance band Astral Projection. It was released on 20 October 1997, through Trust In Trance Records. It has become one of the best-selling trance albums.

The voices in the songs "Dancing Galaxy", "No One Ever Dreams" and "Ambient Galaxy (Disco Valley Mix)" is taken from the film Dune (1984).

The voice in the song "Flying Into A Star" is taken from the sixth season of Star Trek: The Next Generation's: episode 22, Suspicions (1993).

The Japanese release includes a bonus three-inch CD single.

Singles 
"Dancing Galaxy" ,17 November 1997, was the first song to be a released as a single from the album, it includes the song "Ambient Galaxy (Disco Valley Mix)" as a b–side.

"Liquid Sun" , 2000, was released as a second single, with a remix by Cass & Slide. It peaked at number 91 in UK singles charts, number 27 in the dance singles chart and number 19 in UK Independent chart. Astral Projection's only chartering song there.

Critical reception 

John Bush from AllMusic said "The climax of Astral Projection's search for intelligent trance, Dancing Galaxy offers wave after wave of exquisitely produced acid lines on tracks like "No One Ever Dreams," "Soundform" and the title track."

Track listing

Credits and personnel 
Locations
 Recorded at Dance City Studios, Tel Aviv
 Digital Mastering at Village mastering
Musicians
 Lior Perlmutter – songwriting, programming, producer and mixing
 Avi Nissim – songwriting, programming, producer
 Ben Bernfeld – digital Mastering
Engineering
 Lior Perlmutter – engineering
Creative
 Ido Eshed – art direction and design
 Yossi F. – art direction and design

References

External links 
 Dancing Galaxy at Discogs

1997 albums
Astral Projection (band) albums